Surgical treatments of ingrown toenails include a number of different options. If conservative treatment of a minor ingrown toenail does not succeed or if the ingrown toenail is severe, surgical management by a podiatrist is recommended. The initial surgical approach is typically a partial avulsion of the nail plate known as a wedge resection or a complete removal of the toenail. If the ingrown toenail recurs despite this treatment, destruction of the germinal matrix with phenol is recommended. As an alternative one may use 10% sodium hydroxide which is less toxic or trichloroacetic acid which may give faster healing time.  Antibiotics are not needed if surgery is performed.

Wedge resection
The physician will perform an onychectomy in which the nail along the edge that is growing into the skin is cut away (ablated) and the offending piece of nail is pulled out. Any infection is surgically drained. This process is referred to as a "wedge resection" or simple surgical ablation and is not permanent (i.e., the nail will re-grow from the matrix). The entire procedure may be performed in a physician's office in approximately thirty to forty-five minutes depending on the extent of the problem. The patient is allowed to go home the same day and the recovery time is anywhere from two weeks to two months barring any complications such as infection. As a follow-up, a physician may prescribe an oral or topical antibiotic or a special soak to be used for about a week after the surgery. Some use "lateral onychoplasty," or "wedge resection," as the method of choice for ingrown toenails. A wide wedge resection, with a total cleaning (removal) of nail matrix, has a nearly 100% success rate.  Some physicians will not perform a complete nail avulsion (removal) except under extreme circumstances.  In most cases, these physicians will remove both sides of a toenail (even if one side is not currently ingrown) and coat the nail matrix on both sides with a chemical or acid (usually phenol) to prevent re-growth.  This leaves most of the nail intact, but ensures that the problem of ingrowth will not recur. There are possible disadvantages if the nail matrix is not coated with the applicable chemical or acid (phenol) and is allowed to re-grow; this method is prone to failure. Also, the underlying condition can still become symptomatic if the nail grows back within a year: the nail matrix could be growing a nail that is too curved, thick, wide or otherwise irregular to allow normal growth. Furthermore, the flesh can become injured by concussion, tight socks, quick twisting motions while walking, or simply  because the nail is growing incorrectly (likely too wide). This hypersensitivity to continued injury can mean chronic ingrowth; the solution is nearly always edge avulsion by the more effective procedure of phenolisation.

Avulsion procedure
In case of recurrence after complete removal, and if the patient never felt any pain before inflammation occurred, the condition is more likely to be onychia which is often confused for an ingrown or ingrowing nail (onychocryptosis). Complete removal of the whole nail is a simple procedure. Anaesthetic is injected and the nail is removed quickly by pulling it outward from the toe. The patient can function normally right after the procedure and most of the discomfort goes away in a few days. The entire procedure can be performed in approximately 20 minutes and is less complex than the wedge resection. The nail often grows back, however, and in most cases it can cause more problems by becoming ingrown again. It can get injured by concussion and in some cases grows back too thick, too wide or deformed. This procedure can result in chronic ingrown nails causing more pain. Accordingly, in some cases as determined by a doctor, the nail matrix is coated with a chemical (usually phenol) so none of the nail will ever grow back. This is known as a permanent or full nail avulsion, or full matrixectomy, phenolisation, or full phenol avulsion. As can be seen in the images below, the nail-less toe does not look like a normal toe. Fake nails or nail varnish can still be applied to the area to provide a normal appearance. In a few cases phenolisation is not successful and has to be repeated. Podiatrists routinely warn patients of this possibility of regrowth.

Vandenbos procedure
The Vandenbos procedure was first described by Vandenbos and Bowers in 1959 in the US Armed Forces Medical Journal. They reported on 55 patients, all without recurrences. Since 1988 Dr. Henry Chapeskie has performed this procedure on over 2,700 patients who had no recurrences. Unlike other procedures, the Vandenbos procedure does not touch the nail. In this procedure, the affected toe is anesthetized with a digital block and a tourniquet is applied. An incision is made proximally from the base of the nail about 5 mm (leaving the nail bed intact) then extended toward the side of the toe/toenail in an elliptical sweep to end up under the tip of the nail about 3–4 mm in from the edge. It is important that all the skin at the edge of the nail be removed. The excision must be adequate leaving a soft tissue deficiency measuring 1.5 × 3 cm. A portion of the lateral aspect of the distal phalanx is occasionally exposed without fear of infection. Antibiotics are not necessary as the wound is left open to close by secondary intention. Postoperative management involves soaking of the toe in warm water 3 times/day for 15–20 minutes. The wound is healed in 4–6 weeks. No cases of osteomyelitis have been reported. After healing, the nail fold skin remains low and tight at the side of the nail. The rationale is that the nail itself is usually healthy, but overgrown by skin; when walking, the bilateral nail folds are pressed upwards, which is why narrowing the nail causes excessive recurrences, contrary to narrowing the nail fold.

The Syme procedure 
In difficult or recurrent cases of onychocryptosis (ingrown toenail) the patient's symptoms persist necessitating a permanent operative solution. The "avulsion procedure" is simple but the surgeon must be skilled enough to accomplish total destruction, and removal of, the nail matrix. Another disadvantage is the long healing and recovery time(> 2 months). In these cases, the best method is the Syme procedure, that means total nail matrix removal + skin flap transfer + phalanx partial osteotomy + stitching.

Phenolisation

Following injection of a local anaesthetic at the base of the toenail and perhaps application of a tourniquet, the surgeon will remove (ablate) the edge of the nail growing into the flesh and destroy the matrix area with phenol to permanently and selectively ablate the matrix that is producing the ingrown portion of the nail (i.e., the nail margin).  This is known as a partial matrixectomy, phenolisation, phenol avulsion or partial nail avulsion with matrix phenolisation. Also, any infection is surgically drained. After this procedure, other suggestions on aftercare will be made, such as salt water bathing of the toe. The purpose of the procedure is to prevent re-growth where the matrix was cauterized. After the procedure, the nail is slightly narrower (usually one millimeter or so) and is barely noticeable a year later. The surgery is advantageous because it can be performed in the doctor's office under local anesthesia and recovery time is minimal. There is no visible scar on the surgery site and a nominal chance of recurrence. However, if the phenol is improperly or inadequately applied, the nail matrix can regenerate from its partial cauterization and grow a new nail. This will result in a recurrence of the ingrown nail in approximately 4–6 months as the skin that the original ingrown nail grew under would also recover from the procedure. The recovery of the skin on either side of the nail is standard in this type of procedure. Many patients who have a minor recurrence of the ingrown nail often have the procedure performed again. However, in cases of severe recurrence, a podiatrist can perform the procedure again or resort to a more involved, permanent solution such as removal of the entire nail or the Vandenbos Procedure.

References

External links

"Ingrown Toenails" Information regarding ingrown toenails and a detailed description of the Vandenbos procedure including pictures, research articles and a video of the procedure
"Nail Surgery" Chapter 33 of Textbook of Hallux Valgus and Forefoot Surgery,complete text online in PDF file
"Complete Nail Surgery Photos Photos and comments showing a full nail removal from beginning to end.

Podiatry
Dermatology